Global Islamic Finance Awards (GIFA) are one of the most prestigious awards in Islamic banking and finance. Other prestigious awards are Islamic Development Bank Prize in Islamic Banking and Finance (also known as "IsDB Prize"), and The Royal Award For Islamic Finance, founded by the government of Malaysia. GIFA was founded by the consulting firm Edbiz (and currently managed by Cambridge IFA) as part of its advocacy for Islamic banking and finance. Since its inception in 2011, GIFA has emerged as the Number One Islamic finance awards programme in the world.

GIFA Laureates 

Every year, the Awards Committee of GIFA elects a head of state or government (or a leading personality equivalent in stature and significance) as winner of its top award, called Global Islamic Finance Leadership Award. The winner is also known as GIFA Laureate. GIFA has emerged as the second awarding body after the Nobel Peace Prize, in terms of number of presentation of awards to heads of state or governments. 

Since the inception of GIFA in 2011, it has announced 12 GIFA Laureates, including:
 HE Tun Abdullah Badawi, Former Prime Minister of Malaysia - 2011 
 HRH Sultan Nazrin Shah of the Malaysian State of Perak - 2012
 HE Shaukat Aziz, Former Prime Minister of Pakistan - 2013
 HE Nursultan Nazarbayev, President of the Republic of Kazakhstan - 2014
 HRH Muhammadu Sanusi II, Emir of Kano, Nigeria - 2015
 HE Joko Widodo, President of the Republic of Indonesia - 2016
 HE Ismail Omar Guilleh, President of the Republic of Djibouti - 2017
HE Bakir Izetbegović, Chairman of the Presidency of Bosnia and Herzegovina (President of Bosnia-Herzegovina) - 2018
HE Cyril Ramaphosa, President of South Africa - 2019
HE Arif Alvi, President of Pakistan - 2020
HE Ma'ruf Amin, Vice President of Indonesia
HE Abiy Ahmed Ali, Prime Minister of Ethiopia

GIFA Categories 

There are numerous categories of GIFA.

Top Awards 

Top Awards include: [1] Global Islamic Finance Leadership Award (Individual Category); [2] Global Islamic Finance Leadership Award (Country Category); and [3] Global Islamic Finance Leadership Award (Institutional Category). While the first leadership award in this category is awarded annually (see above), the other two categories are discretionary and are decided on the basis of a number of factors, including the choice of venue for the Awards Ceremony. So far, three countries have been honoured with the Country Awards, namely Malaysia (2014), Dubai (2017) and Djibouti (2022). The Institutional Award has so far been bestowed upon Islamic Development Bank (2015), KNEKS (2021) and DDCAP (2022).

Celebratory Awards 

A number of celebratory awards are decided by the Awards Committee every year to recognise efforts and advocacy of institutions and individuals from outside the global Islamic financial services industry, mainly (but not necessarily) from the public sector. These include:

GIFA Championship Awards 

In 2017, GIFA Championship Awards were introduced to acknowledge services of some leading personalities and entities, which have played the role of a catalyst in their respective jurisdictions. The following three Championship Awards were announced in 2017:

 GIFA Championship Award for the Republic of Tatarstan for its championship role to promote Islamic banking and finance in the Federation of Russia 
 GIFA Championship Award for public sector support was presented to Mr. Bakhyt Sultanov, Minister of Finance, Republic of Kazakhstan 
 GIFA Championship Award for regulatory support was presented to Ms. Elvira Nabuillina, Governor of Central Bank of Russia

GIFA Special Awards 

GIFA Special Awards (Leadership Role) have so far been given to three individuals:

 Mr. Yasin Anwar, Governor of State Bank of Pakistan (2011)
 Mr. Sanusi Lamido Sanusi, Governor of Central Bank of Nigeria (2013)
 Mr. Yerlan A. Baidaulet, Advisor on Islamic Finance, Government of Kazakhstan (2015)

GIFA Special Awards (Advocacy Role) have been presented to:

 Dr. Zambry Abdul Kadir, Chief Minister of Perak, Malaysia (2014)
 Mr. Muhammad Ishaq Dar, Finance Minister of Pakistan (2015)
 Mr. Saeed Ahmed, Deputy Governor of State Bank of Pakistan (2016).

In 2017, the following three GIFA Special Awards were announced:

 GIFA Special Award (for Leadership in Takaful) to Wael Al Sharif, CEO of Takaful Emarat
 GIFA Special Award (for Leadership in Islamic Retail Banking) to Kashif Mohammed Naeem, EVP and Head of Retail, SME and Microfinance at Bank of Khartoum
 GIFA Special Award (for Advocacy of Islamic Financial Criminology) to Professor Dr. Normah Omar, Director of Accounting Research Institute at Universiti Teknologi MARA

Islamic Finance Advocacy Awards 

Islamic Finance Advocacy Awards are presented to the individuals and organisations from within the global Islamic financial services industry (as opposed to the above-mentioned GIFA Special Awards (Advocacy Role) that are presented to the individuals and institutions from outside the industry. Previous winners of Islamic Finance Advocacy Awards include:

 Linar Yakupov, CEO of Tatarstan Investment Development Agency, the Russian Federation (and a leading advocate of Islamic banking and finance in the CIS countries)(2015)
 Khazanah Nasional Berhad (2016)

GIFA Lifetime Achievement Award 

Inaugurated in 2016, GIFA Lifetime Achievement Award is presented to an exceptional leader for their lifetime contributions to Islamic banking and finance. The winners include:

 KH. Dr. Ma’aruf Amin of Indonesia (2016)
 Dr. Yahia Abdul-Rahman, Founder of LARIBA Islamic Finance in the USA (2017)
 Mufti Taqi Usmani, Renowned Shari'a scholar (2020)

Prestige Awards 

Only a selected number of individuals are elected to receive the Prestige Awards, which recognise excellence in profession, leadership within an organisation and advocacy of Islamic banking and finance. Following are the main categories in the Prestige Awards:

 Islamic Finance Personality of the Year
 Islamic Banker of the Year
 GIFA CEO of the Year (started in 2016)
 Takaful CEO of the Year (started in 2017)

Dato' Wan Mohd Fadzmi Wan Othman (CEO of Agrobank, Malaysia) became the first GIFA CEO of the Year in 2016, followed by Jamal Saeed Bin Ghalaita (CEO of Emirate Islamic Bank) in 2017.

Datuk Abd Latiff Abu Bakar (CEO of Takaful Ikhlas) became the inaugural Takaful CEO of the Year in 2017.

GIFA Market Leadership Awards 

In 2016, the Awards Committee decided to include a new category in the name of GIFA Market Leadership Awards to recognise the leadership role of institutions in particular sub-sectors of the industry. In the two years since their inception, the following institutions have been recognised for leadership in their respective sectors/sub-sectors:

2016 

 GIFA Market Leadership Award to Dubai Islamic Bank for developing Islamic banking and finance globally
 GIFA Market Leadership Award to Bank Syariah Mandiri for playing a leadership role in developing Islamic banking market in Indonesia
 GIFA Market Leadership Award to AbleAce Raakin for developing a market for commodity facilitation and support in Asia
 GIFA Market Leadership Award to Islamic Business School, Universiti Utara Malaysia, for providing thought leadership, teaching and research in Islamic banking and finance
 GIFA Market Leadership Award for Islamic financial Technology to ITS
 GIFA Market Leadership Award for Islamic financial intelligence and ratings to Moody's

2017 

 GIFA Market Leadership Award to DDCAP Group for commodity facilitation and support globally
 GIFA Market Leadership Award for Islamic asset management to SEDCO Capital
 GIFA Market Leadership Award for Islamic financial intelligence and ratings to Moody's
 GIFA Market Leadership Award for pawnbroking services to Bank Rakyat of Malaysia

Other Award Winners are given in the Table below:

[1] For Global Research Excellence in Islamic Financial Criminology

Upcoming Personalities Awards 

Over the years, Upcoimng Personalities Awards have increased in number and significance, as the Table below demonstrates.

Occasional Categories 

In addition to regular categories, every year the Awards Committee may decide to present awards to institutions that do not fall under any other category. The winners so far have been listed in the Table below.

See also

 List of religion-related awards

References

Islamic awards
Awards established in 2011
Islamic economic jurisprudence